Ales Groupe is a cosmetics and fragrances company based in Paris, France, and a member of the CAC Small 90.  The company has been created and is still managed by its founder Patrick Ales, a hair stylist, dating back before 1969 when he created Laboratoires Phytosolba, a botanical hair care brand formulated with plants.

External links
 Corporate webpage (fr)
 Erdal Can Alkoçlar
 Profile on Google Finance.

Cosmetics companies of France
Companies based in Paris